Thórarinn Leifsson (born 29 July 1966) is an Icelandic author and illustrator. He graduated from the Icelandic Academy of Arts in 1989. In that same period he was a street painter in western Europe.

Thórarinn Leifsson worked as an illustrator and web designer for several years before making his literary debut with Father’s Big Secret in 2007 – a dark tale for children about a cannibal father and his complicated relationship with his children.

In 2009 Thórarinn wrote Grandmother's Library for children and young adults, a work inspired by the bank collapse and what the author felt was the empty materialism of Icelandic society in the years leading up to the crisis. The book was awarded the Reykjavik Children Books Prize in 2010 and nominated for the Nordic Children's Book Prize in 2011 – an award given out every two years by librarians in the Nordic countries.

In 2001 Thórarinn wrote an autobiographical novel called The Street Painter, based on his experiences as a vagabond in southern Spain and Morocco in the late eighties. Although illustrated like much of Thórarinn's other work, Street Painter targets a more mature audience.

The Man Who Hated Children, a novel for young adults, was published in the autumn of 2014. In the sense of style this book continues where Grandmother's Library left off. The setting is a twisted present-day Reykjavik with elements of crime fiction in the storyline. The Man Who Hated Children was nominated for The Icelandic Literary Prize, the foremost prize of the northern nation.

Thórarinn Leifsson's first stageplay, The Foreign Kid, premiered on 16 November 2014 in Tjarnarbio in Reykjavik. The 70 minutes piece produced by independent theater company Glenna, is intended for 6 actors in 8 roles and deals with immigration and cultural nationalism in Iceland. The show received much praise and attention from the media and all 9 shows before Christmas were sold out with plans to reopen in the spring of 2015. Quite an achievement for an independent theater production in Iceland.

The rights to Thórarinn Leifsson's books are managed by Forlagid and have so far been sold to Germany, Denmark, Norway, Faroe Islands, Finland, Estonia, Italy, Brasil, Hungary and Turkey.

Personal life 
Thórarinn currently lives in Berlin with his wife and colleague Auður Jónsdóttir. He has two children;  Leifur Ottó born in 2011, and Salvor born in 1992.

References

External links
Official site

Living people
1966 births
Thorarinn Leifsson
Thorarinn Leifsson